Dale Whiteside (October 19, 1930 – July 4, 2021) was an American politician who served in the Missouri House of Representatives from 1987 to 1997.

He died on July 4, 2021, in Chillicothe, Missouri, at age 90.

References

1930 births
2021 deaths
Republican Party members of the Missouri House of Representatives
People from Chillicothe, Missouri